Jehan de Grieviler (fl. mid- to late 13th century) was an Artesian cleric and trouvère.

Jehan was probably born at Grévillers near Arras. A certain "Grieviler" is mentioned in the necrology (registre) of the Confrérie des jongleurs et des bourgeois d'Arras under 1254. Elizabeth Aubrey argues that since Jehan was a known member of the Puy d'Arras, he cannot be identified with the "Grieviler" of the necrology. More recent work on these institutions by Carol Symes has suggested they were in fact the same. Nonetheless, a further piece of evidence for establishing his chronology are the songs he is known to have composed with Adam de la Halle, who was very young in the 1250s. Probably Jehan was one of the sixteen unordained married clerics in minor orders who petitioned the Bishop of Arras on 28 January 1254 to exempt them from secular taxation. They were evidently involved in trade and commerce.

Jehan participated in a total of thirty-four jeux partis, initiating six of the exchanges himself. Twenty-eight of these were with Jehan Bretel. Three of these last have surviving melodies, probably composed by him. He also wrote six chansons courtoises, and a seventh attributed to Jehan de la Fontaine may be by him. He also composed one surviving rotrouenge.

All of his melodies are conventional, save Uns pensers jolis, which is through-composed, and Jolie amours qui m'a en sa baillie, which begins on B and ranges from high to low F.

List of compositions
Chansons
Amours me fait de cuer joli chanter (attributed Jehan de la Fontaine) 
Entre raison et amour grant tourment
Jolie amours qui m'a en sa baillie
Jolis espoirs et amoureus desir
Pour bone amour et ma dame honorer
S'amours envoisie
Uns pensers jolis

Rotrouenges
Dolans, iriés, plains d'ardure

Jeux partis with music probably by Grieviler
Cuvelier, un jugement
Jehan Bretel, une jolie dame
Jehan Bretel, votre avis

Jeux partis with Jehan Bretel
Conseilliez moi, Jehan de Grieviler
Grieviler, a ma requeste, no music
Grieviler, del quel doit estre
Grieviler, deus dames sai d'une beauté
Grieviler, deus dames sont
Grieviler, dites moi voir, no music
Grieviler, feme avés prise
Grieviler, ja en ma vie, no music
Grieviler, par maintes fies
Grieviler, par quel raison, no music
Grieviler, par vo bapteme
Grieviler, se vous aviés
Grieviler, se vous quidiés
Grieviler, s'il avenoit, no music
Grieviler, un jugement
Grieviler, vostre ensient, two melodies
Grieviler, vostre pensee
Jehan de Grieviler, deus dames sai, no music
Jehan de Grieviler, sage
Jehan de Grieviler, s'aveuc celi, no music
Jehan de Grieviler, une
Jehan de Grieviler, un jugement, no music
Prince del Pui, mout bien savés trouver, proposed by Grieviler
Respondés a ma demande, two melodies
Sire Bretel, je vous vueill demander, proposed by Grieviler, no music
Sire Bretel, vous qui d'amours savez, proposed by Grieviler, no music

Notes

References
Aubrey, Elizabeth. "Jehan de Grieviler." Grove Music Online. Oxford Music Online. Accessed 20 September 2008.

Trouvères
Male classical composers